No Average Angel is the second studio album by American singer Tiffany Giardina. The album was released on January 20, 2009 through 785 Records and sold 2,400 copies in its first week. The singles, "Hurry Up and Save Me" and "No Average Angel" were also included on the Another Cinderella Story soundtrack.

Composition 
Recording sessions began in 2008. When asked about her album, Giardina responded "It’s basically just about being yourself and not being afraid to be who you are." In an interview with "Artist Direct", she talked about the songs on the album, saying "Every song has a different story, experience and vibe to it. I'm so excited for this album to come out. I really got involved in every aspect, from the writing to the artwork. It's very personal for me, and I couldn't be happier with it." She stated that her role-model is Audrey Hepburn. The closest song from the album for Giardina is "Falling Down", stating "The song's about persevering. If you're having a bad day, keep moving forward. If you're falling down, pick yourself back up and move on." When asked why she chose to cover "Eternal Flame" she said "It's one of my favorite songs! I had to do a cover of it. I totally wanted to sing it on the record. The president of my label is really into rock music, and that's one of his favorite songs too. That was everyone's choice for a cover." She also stated that she gets excited when she hears her songs on the radio by saying "The first time I heard 'No Average Angel' on the radio I freaked out. I was driving around blasting it, It's about being yourself, not being afraid to be different.

Critical reception 

"No Average Angel" gained mixed reviews. Amy Sciarretto, from Artist Direct, gave the album 3 out of 5 stars and wrote "On her debut album, the 15-year-old, New York City-reared songstress exudes bucketfuls of sass, tossing her long, curly tendrils and singing in a high pitch that will magnetically attract rebellious tweeners to her music." and "Giardina will certainly appeal to the pre-teen set in a way that Britney Spears no longer can. No Average Angel is a fluffy, frothy collection of bubblegum pop in a day and age where blowing bubbles is still fun!"

Farnaz Youshei from Campus Circle gave the album a D− writing "The 16-year-old, whose music has been featured in  Another Cinderella Story and Disney's Tinker Bell, sounds like any other Disney-produced teen pop star. It is true that Giardina is not signed to the Disney label, however, it is hard not to notice the similarities between her resonance and those of Disney productions like Miley Cyrus. No Average Angel is just a regular one."

Promotion
Giardina performed "No Average Angel" at the 2008 UBS Parade Spectacula in Stamford, Connecticut. On January 18, 2009, Giardina had a release party for her album at FYE in Port Chester, New York where she performed some of the songs off the album. A TV commercial aired on Nickelodeon and Disney Channel to promote the album which features a male announcer. She also performed songs from the album at the 2009 Bamboozle in New Jersey.

Singles
The first single off the album was "Hurry Up and Save Me" and the second was "No Average Angel". Both music videos was shot in New York City. The videos have Tiffany running around New York City. She's clumsy and she runs into people. She finds herself in these weird scenarios. She ends up in Times Square singing to her friends. Both videos were directed by Andrew Bennett. Both singles were also on a miniature EP, also called "No Average Angel". It was only available for a limited edition. It was released November 25, 2008 only at FYE.

Track listing

Notes
Song lengths, writing credits and producing credits taken from the No Average Angel liner notes.
The first 1,000 copies of the album includes a DVD with the music videos for "No Average Angel" and "Hurry Up and Save Me".

Personnel
Credits for No Average Angel adapted from Artist Direct.

Tiffany Giardina - Lead Vocals
Brian Malouf - Mixing
Sean Hurley - Bass
Dennis Leeflang - Drums on tracks 3, 7, 10, 13
Mark Eichner - Executive Producer, A&R
Jeff Franzel - Composer
Jason Lehning - Piano, Fender Rhodes, Engineer, Composer
Mike Beck - Organ, Engineer, Producer
Beverly "Ruby" Ross - Composer
Cynthia Cochrane - Production Coordination
Ralph Churchwell - Composer, Producer
Antonina Armato - Composer
Denise Rich - Composer
Julius Edward Dixon - Composer
John Deaderick - Piano, Organ (Hammond), Wurlitzer
David Mead - Composer
Tal Herzberg - Mixing
Kathryn Raio - Vocals (Background)
Tim Marks - Bass
Jimmy Farkas - Guitar
Jill Walsh - Composer, Vocals (Background), Producer
Kyle Ford - Engineer
Tiffany Giardina - Composer
Chris Decocco - Engineer
James Frazee - Assistant Engineer
Anthony Battaglia - Composer
David Katz - Composer
Ted Jensen - Mastering

Charts

References

External links 
 
 Missoandfriends.com
 Blog.scholastic.com
 Teenmusic.com

2009 albums